The Church of St Chad (also known as St Chad's) is on Church Lane, Pleasley Vale, Nottinghamshire, England. It is an active Church of England parish church in the deanery of Mansfield, the Archdeaconry of Newark, and the Southwell and Nottingham diocese. Its benefice has two  churches, Church of St Edmund, Mansfield Woodhouse is the main parish church and St Chad's the other. The church is recorded in the National Heritage List for England as a designated Grade II listed building.

History
St Chad's was built by Joseph Paget after he inherited his parents' estate and consequently became a senior partner in nearby Pleasley Vale Mills. In 1876, deciding that his household and mill workers needed a church, a chapel was built overlooking the vale, on the Derbyshire side of the River Meden. The chapel was built of timber, painted white, by Cox & Sons of London.

After disagreement "over the style of services conducted in the church" Joseph Paget had the church dismantled and rebuilt just over the River Meden boundary in Nottinghamshire, thus moving it from the Diocese of Lichfield to the Diocese of Southwell and Nottingham. The church was reconstructed in brick and stone, with a bell tower and lead roof.

Organ
The organ dates from 1880 by Lloyd & Co of Nottingham.

Gallery

References 

Pleasley Vale
Pleasley Vale
Pleasley Vale
Mansfield